The Men's 5 km Open Water event at the 2010 South American Games was held on March 23, 2010 at 10:00.

Medalists

Results

References
Report

Open Water 5km M